Alfeld is a municipality in the district of Nürnberger Land in Bavaria in Germany. Alfeld has around 1100 inhabitants (2013) and is famous for their traditional Kermesse which the people celebrate at the end of August every year.

Pictures

References

External links
 Official website

Nürnberger Land